{{DISPLAYTITLE:C15H14O5}}
The molecular formula C15H14O5 (molar mass : 274.26 g/mol, exact mass : 274.084123) may refer to:
 Polyphenols
 Afzelechin (Epiafzelechin), a flavan-3-ol
 Apiforol, a flavan-4-ol
 Fisetinidol, a flavan-3-ol
 Methysticin, a kavalactone
 Oritin (Epioritin), a flavan-3-ol
 Phloretin, a dihydrochalcone